"Runaways" is a song by Swedish band Eclipse. The song was released in Sweden as a digital download on 28 February 2016, and was written by Erik Mårtensson. It took part in Melodifestivalen 2016, and placed fifth in the fourth semi-final.

Track listing

Chart performance

Weekly charts

Release history

References

2015 songs
2016 singles
Eclipse (band) songs
Melodifestivalen songs of 2016
English-language Swedish songs